The Anglican Diocese in New England is a diocese of the Anglican Church in North America (ACNA).  The diocese, based in Amesbury, Massachusetts, comprises 26 congregations in 6 American states, Connecticut, Maine, Massachusetts, New Hampshire, Rhode Island and Vermont. The state with most congregations is Massachusetts, with 14.

The diocese was created as a result of the Anglican realignment movement in that region of the United States, in 2009, and was officially recognized by ACNA on June 10, 2010, during the annual Provincial Council and College of Bishops meeting which took place  in Amesbury, Massachusetts, 7–11 June 2010.

The Rev. William Murdoch was elected as the first bishop of the diocese. He had served as rector of All Saints Episcopal Church in West Newbury, Massachusetts, since 1993, and left the Episcopal Church with his congregation in 2007 to join the Anglican Church in North America upon its creation in 2009. He was nominated Suffragan Bishop of the Archbishop of the Anglican Church of Kenya to assist in the formation of a new Anglican province in the United States and Canada. He was elected the first bishop of the Anglican Diocese in New England in 2009 and was installed in 2010. Murdoch resigned as rector of the All Saints Anglican Church in Amesbury in February 2012 to focus on his work as bishop of the diocese.

Andrew Williams was elected on 17 November 2018, by diocesan synod, to be the second bishop of the Anglican Diocese in New England, and was consecrated on 16 March 2019.

References

External links
Anglican Diocese in New England Official Website

Dioceses of the Anglican Church in North America
Anglican realignment dioceses
Anglican dioceses established in the 21st century
Religion in New England